Antoinette Meyer, later Molitor (19 June 1920 – 19 July 2010) was a Swiss alpine skier who competed in the 1948 Winter Olympics. She was born in Hospental and was married with Karl Molitor. In 1948 she won the silver medal in the slalom event. In the downhill competition she finished eleventh.

External links
 Antoinette Meyer's profile at Sports Reference.com
 Antoinette Meyer's obituary 

1920 births
2010 deaths
Swiss female alpine skiers
Olympic alpine skiers of Switzerland
Alpine skiers at the 1948 Winter Olympics
Olympic silver medalists for Switzerland
Olympic medalists in alpine skiing
Medalists at the 1948 Winter Olympics
20th-century Swiss women